The 1977–78 Boston University Terriers men's ice hockey team represented Boston University in college ice hockey. In its 5th year under head coach Jack Parker the team compiled a 30–2–0 record and reached the NCAA tournament for the fifth consecutive season and thirteenth all-time. The Terriers defeated Boston College 5–3 in the championship game at the Providence Civic Center in Providence, Rhode Island to win their third national championship.

This was the first championship team to play more games on the road than at home.

Season

Winning
After four consecutive ECAC tournament championships, and nothing to show for it at the national level, Boston University came out of the gate swinging. Backstopped by the tandem of Jim Craig and team co-captain Brian Durocher, BU walloped Merrimack in the season opener before starting their conference schedule. The first four ECAC matches were all close affairs, with only one having more than a one-goal margin, but the Terriers managed to win each game.

Boston University did not participate in a holiday tournament during the season, opting instead to play three non-conference games against Air Force and Michigan State where they, again, won each match. After a 6–5 win over rival Cornell the Terriers began an arduous road schedule; in a ten-game span over 4 weeks the Terriers would play eight games on the road. BU struggled most nights to dominate what would normally be inferior competition but the Terriers continued to win night in and night out. By the time the Beanpot rolled around in early February BU remained unbeaten and possessed a sparkling 19–0 record. Their 15–0 conference record all but guaranteed the Terriers first place in the ECAC tournament and when they throttled arch-rival Boston College 12–5 in the Beanpot semis the Terriers looked on track to join 1969–70 Cornell win an undefeated season.

First Loss
Two days after a second victory over the Eagles, BU headed to New Haven, Connecticut where they were finally burned by playing all those close games. Yale managed to score 7 goals on BU, the third time that the Terriers had allowed that many goals, but Boston University only netted 5 and suffered their first loss of the season, ending a 21-game winning streak. After two more close wins BU punished Harvard 7–1 in the Beanpot championship and won their 10th title. The Terriers ended the regular season three days later with yet another one-goal victory to finish with the best record in program history at 25–1.

ECAC tournament
BU served as the host for their quarterfinal meeting with New Hampshire and despite the Wildcat's 8th-seed UNH possessed a better offence than Boston University. New Hampshire demonstrated their scoring prowess throughout the game but the Terriers were just a little bit better on the night and managed to pull out a 6–5 win in overtime. Their semifinal meeting against Providence, however, could not have gone worse. Needing just one more win to guarantee a spot in the NCAA tournament, BU's offense faltered and scored once, only the second time all season where they had failed to record at least 4 goals. Providence meanwhile pumped five pucks into the Terriers' net and skated to a relatively easy victory.

The loss dealt a serious blow to BU's title hopes but it did not end them entirely. Boston University's first champion in 1971 came as a result of being chosen over conference runner-up Clarkson and in the meantime the NCAA selection committee had given itself the ability to add up to four additional teams to the tournament if they so desired. However, before any of that would occur, BU would have to take care of business in the third-place game against Brown. BU's 8–4 win pushed its record to 27–2 and with their 21-game streak to start the season the selection committee did award Boston University with an at-large bid, the only time in the 4-year history of the then-format where the committee invited an additional team.

NCAA tournament
Not wanting to waste the opportunity given to them, Boston University defense showed up to play in the tournament. In their First Round meeting, a rematch with Providence, BU found itself on the road in front of a very hostile crowd. While the Friars were hoping to even the season series the Terriers ended Providence's tournament with a 5–3 victory. The championship rounds of the tournament were being held down the road at the Providence Civic Center so BU had a very short distance to travel. Waiting for them was WCHA co-champion and defending national champion Wisconsin. Despite possessing the top two scorers in the nation, Wisconsin was unable to bring their offense to bear and BU finally made it to a championship game after four years of futility.

In the title tilt BU faced off against BC who had lost the previous three meetings by a combined score of 28–13. The Eagles gave themselves no favors when Joe Augustine took a penalty just 9 seconds into the game, allowing BU's leading scorer Mark Fidler to open the scoring with a power play goal 38 seconds in. Boston College responded with two goals in the middle of the period but BU regained the lead with two of their own before the first 20 minutes had ended. In the most penalty-filled contest in NCAA history (22 minor penalties in total) Tony Meagher scored a short-handed goal to give BU a 3–2 lead and then got his second score ten minutes later to build the first two-goal cushion of the night. Fidler notched his own second goal one minute into the third and Jim Craig turned aside 22 of BC's 23 shots in the final 40 minutes to give Boston University its third national championship.

Awards and honors
Future olympian Jack O'Callahan was named as the Tournament MOP and joined on the All-Tournament Team by teammates Dave Silk, Dick Lamby and Mark Fidler. No Terrier was named to the AHCA All-American East Team despite their stellar record but head coach Jack Parker received his second Spencer Penrose Award as the national coach of the year. Mark Fidler received the ECAC Rookie of the Year Award. O'Callahan was named to the All-ECAC Hockey First Team, while Lamby and Silk made the Second Team.

Five players were selected in the 1978 NHL Amateur Draft with only Dave Silk managing to reach the NHL. Three players, however, later achieved hockey immortality as members of the goal medal-winning team at the 1980 Winter Olympics (Jack O'Callahan, Dave Silk and Jim Craig).

Standings

Schedule

|-
!colspan=12 style=";" | Regular Season

|-
!colspan=12 style=";" | 

|-
!colspan=12 style=";" | 

|-
!colspan=12 style=";" |

Roster and scoring statistics

Goaltending statistics

1978 championship game

(E1) Boston College vs. (A2) Boston University

Players drafted into the NHL

1978 NHL Amateur Draft

References

Boston University Terriers men's ice hockey seasons
Boston University
Boston University
Boston University
Boston University
Boston University
Boston University
Boston University
Boston University